Major General Johann Christoph, Graf von Wylich and Lottum (9 May 1681 in Cleves – 16 October 1727 at Schloss Hueth, in Rees) was a Prussian officer.

Notes

References
 

1681 births
1727 deaths